Mohammed Sani Sami was Governor of Bauchi State, Nigeria from January 1984 to August 1985 during the military regime of Major General Muhammadu Buhari.

Early life 
Mohammed Sani Sami was born in Zuru in Kebbi State.
He joined the army on 10 December 1962, and attended training courses with Ibrahim Babangida.
He attended the Mons Officer Cadet School, Aldershot (United Kingdom), and was commissioned on July 25, 1963.
General Murtala Muhammed, head of state from July 1975 to February 1976, appointed Lieutenant Colonel Sani Sami commander of the Brigade of Guards.

Mohammed Sani Sami was appointed governor of Bauchi State after a coup on 31 December 1983 that brought General Muhammadu Buhari to power. He held office until August 1985, when General Ibrahim Babangida took over from Buhari.
He upgraded medical facilities, and undertook a major agricultural development program named "back to land".
During his governorship the world handball championship was held in Bauchi State.

In October 1984, facing a new wave of religious fanaticism, he warned that prohibitions on open air religious preaching remained in force. He also stated that the decision to demolish some Christian churches to make way for a new ring road was not in any way an attack on that religion, and said that the government had allocated land for the Catholic mission to build a new church.

Mohammed Sani Sami retired as a major general on 3 September 1990.
He later became the Emir of Zuru, in Kebbi State.

References

Graduates of the Mons Officer Cadet School
Living people
Nigerian Muslims
Governors of Bauchi State
Nigerian polo players
Year of birth missing (living people)